Mykolaivka, previously Mykolaivka-Vyrivska (until 1957) and later Zhovtneve (1957-2016) is an urban type settlement in Sumy Raion of Sumy Oblast (province) in eastern Ukraine. Population:

History 

During World War II it was under German occupation.

Urban-type settlement since 1957.

In January 1989 the population was 4768 people. 

In January 2013 the population was 4350 people.

The settlement was called Zhovtneve, to commemorate the October Revolution, until 2016. On 19 May 2016, Verkhovna Rada adopted decision to rename Chervone to Esman according to the law prohibiting names of Communist origin.

References

Urban-type settlements in Sumy Raion